Lóránt Szabó (born 28 August 1966) is a Hungarian boxer. He competed in the men's light welterweight event at the 1988 Summer Olympics.

References

1966 births
Living people
Hungarian male boxers
Olympic boxers of Hungary
Boxers at the 1988 Summer Olympics
Sportspeople from Pécs
Light-welterweight boxers